Burkes Creek is a  long 2nd order tributary to Stewarts Creek in Surry County, North Carolina.

Course 
Burkes Creek rises in a pond about 3 miles northwest of White Plains, North Carolina, in Surry County and then flows east-northeast to join Stewarts Creek about 0.5 miles southwest of Mount Airy, North Carolina.

Watershed 
Burkes Creek drains  of area, receives about 47.5 in/year of precipitation, has a wetness index of 376.00, and is about 25% forested.

See also 
 List of Rivers of North Carolina

References 

Rivers of Surry County, North Carolina
Rivers of North Carolina